Valentína Šušolová (born 1 November 1995) is a Slovak footballer who plays as a midfielder for Liberec and has appeared for the Slovakia women's national team.

Career
Šušolová has been capped for the Slovakia national team, appearing for the team during the 2019 FIFA Women's World Cup qualifying cycle.

Football career transfers and statistics 
We are going to show you the list of football clubs and seasons in which Valentína Šušolová has played. It includes the total number of appearance (caps), substitution details, goals, yellow and red cards stats.

References

External links
 
 
 

1995 births
Living people
Slovak women's footballers
Slovakia women's international footballers
Women's association football midfielders
SK Slavia Praha (women) players
FC Slovan Liberec players
Expatriate women's footballers in the Czech Republic
Slovak expatriate sportspeople in the Czech Republic
Czech Women's First League players